Sabse Bada Rupaiya is a 1976 Indian Hindi-language film, produced by Mehmood and directed by S. Ramanathan.The film stars Mehmood, Vinod Mehra, Moushumi Chatterjee, Farida Jalal, Asit Sen, Agha, Keshto Mukherjee and Jeevan. The title song Sabse Bada Rupaiya is inspired by the music to the title song of the Hollywood musical 42nd Street (1933).  The song was used again in an Abhishek Bachchan-starrer Bluffmaster (2005) in the opening credits. The core plot of the movie is based on the 1971 Kannada movie Kasidre Kailasa.

Cast
 Mehmood as Neki Ram
 Vinod Mehra as Amit Rai
 Moushumi Chatterjee as Sunita
 Farida Jalal as Bindiya
 Sulochana Latkar as Mrs. Rai
 Chandrashekhar as Doctor
 Jeevan as Seth Dhanraj

Plot
Generous and honest to a fault, multi-millionaire Amit Rai is always ready to lend a helping hand to the needy, even his business associates. His employee and close friend, Nekiram, warns him against doing this, but in vain. Then hard times visit him and his family, and he loses all his wealth and money, even his palatial home and items therein are to be auctioned. All the people he had helped, his business associates, etc. even his fiancee, Sunita, abandons him. Penniless, homeless, and with a widowed mother, and an unwed sister, he re-locates near a hill station, to begin life anew and works as labour in an orchard. It is there he finds out that his financial ruin did not take place by chance, but it was a deliberate and deceptive plot to rid him of his riches.

Songs
 "Vada Karo Jaanam" - Kishore Kumar, Lata Mangeshkar
 "Bahi Jaiyo Na Raani" - Usha Mangeshkar
 "Na Biwi Na Bachcha, Na Baap" - Mehmood
 "Dariya Kinare Ek Bungla" (aka dariya kinare ek bungalow) - Kishore Kumar, Lata Mangeshkar

References

External links 
 

1976 films
1970s Hindi-language films
Films directed by S. Ramanathan
Hindi remakes of Kannada films